Marek Skurczyński (born 21 August 1951, in Poland) is a Polish retired footballer.

References

Polish footballers
Living people
Association football midfielders
1951 births
Lech Poznań players